The following are some of the activities that normally fall within the scope of general aviation, which encompasses all civil aviation other than scheduled air service:

General aviation
General aviation